KRJW (1240 AM,  "1240 The Winner") is a radio station broadcasting a sports talk format.  It is licensed to Altamont, Oregon, and serves Klamath Falls, Oregon, and the surrounding areas.  The station is currently owned by Wynne Broadcasting, LLC, and licensed to Cove Road Publishing, LLC.  It is currently affiliated with CBS Sports Radio.  It is the Klamath Basin's home for the Portland Trail Blazers NBA basketball and University of Oregon Ducks football.  It also broadcasts high school games featuring Mazama High School with program and sports director Randy Adams on the call.

History
KRJW was granted their FCC license on February 6, 2014 and hit the air soon afterward as a way to fill the void left when rival station KLAD-AM acquired the full-time broadcast affiliation rights of ESPN Radio in 2014.  Sister station KFLS-AM had been an affiliate of ESPN Radio on a part-time basis for a number of years before KLAD-AM acquired the full-time rights.  KRJW immediately became an affiliate of CBS Sports Radio and the new full-time home of Jim Rome, who had previous been featured on its previous station.

The station would soon begin airing Portland Trail Blazers NBA basketball and University of Oregon Ducks football and basketball shortly after signing on the air and moving over from KFLS-AM.  In 2016, the station became the new home station for Mazama High School Vikings sports with Randy Adams on the call.

References

External links

RJW
Klamath Falls, Oregon
Radio stations established in 2014
2014 establishments in Oregon